Who's on Top? is the debut documentary directed by Taiwanese American filmmaker Devin Fei-Fan Tau about four queer athletes who climb Mount Hood, in the U.S. state of Oregon. The 2020 film is narrated by George Takei.

Release
Who's on Top? was shown during the Northwest Film Center's Portland International Film Festival.

The film was made available on multiple streaming services on May 18, 2021, the 41st anniversary of the eruption of Mount St. Helens.

Reception
Janey Wong of the Portland Mercury wrote, "The documentary triumphantly challenges the stereotypes and archetypes of mountaineers and adventurers, seeking to carve out a safe space for people of all genders and sexualities... Crisply shot, the film is a love letter to Oregonians and alpine enthusiasts... Who's On Top is a feel-good watch for anyone needing a little inspiration to get into gear in order to reach their own summit, whatever it may be.

References

External links
 Who's on Top? at IMDb
 

2020 documentary films
2020 films
2020 LGBT-related films
American sports documentary films
American LGBT-related films
Documentary films about LGBT sportspeople
LGBT in Oregon
Mount Hood
2020s American films